Still Life is the sixth album by English progressive rock band Van der Graaf Generator, originally released in 1976. It was their second album after reforming in 1975, the first being Godbluff. One live bonus track was added for the 2005 re-mastered re-release. A new re-master, with 5.1 surround sound re-mixes by Stephen W Tayler, was released on 3 September 2021.

Cover 
The album front cover, photographed by Paul Brierley, shows a Lichtenberg figure. The image was described by journalist Geoff Barton in Sounds: "It's actually a frozen-in-action shot of an electrical discharge from a real Van de Graaff generator machine, set in acrylic."

Response 
Geoff Barton of Sounds wrote: "Where 'Still Life' scores over past LPs is in its precise and accurate reproduction of leader Hammill's vocals. He never really sings, rather he murmurs, shouts, screams or speaks, and this wide range of tonality has presented in the past often insurmountable problems for engineers, technicians and suchlike. Here, however, every subtle nuance of the 'chords has been captured successfully, providing greater variation, an abundance of light and shade. ... 'Still Life' is an essential album. If you think you have problems, listen to Hammill's and you'll probably never be able to worry about anything insignificant ever again." 
 
Jonathan Barnett of New Musical Express, describing the songs on the album, wrote: "They start off with the kind of morbid over-sensibility, y'know ... smart ass existentialist one-liners like that, accompanied by furtive, lurching manic melodies that emphasise the personality disorientation of the whole thing."

Steven McDonald, for AllMusic, notes that Hammill songs take "... a dead run at a grandiose concept or two – the consequences of immortality on the title track, and the grand fate of humanity on the epic "Childlike Faith in Childhood's End." McDonald concludes: "The true highlight, however, is the beautiful, pensive "My Room (Waiting for Wonderland)", with its echoes of imagination and loss. Hammill did not achieve such a level of painful beauty again until "This Side of the Looking Glass" on Over."

Interviewed by Mojo in 2002, Hugh Banton said: "I remember doing Still Life, which is possibly my favourite Van der Graaf album of all, and Charisma came along and said 'Oh, this is just a stop-gap album'. The stop-gap album!? We don't make stop-gap albums!"

Track listing 
All songs written by Peter Hammill, except as noted.

Bonus track (2005 reissue)
 "Gog" – 10:29
(Recorded live at Theatr Gwynedd, Bangor, Wales, on 10 May 1975)

Personnel

Musicians
 Peter Hammill – vocals, guitar, piano
 David Jackson – tenor and soprano saxophones, flute
 Hugh Banton – Hammond organ, bass, Mellotron, piano
 Guy Evans – drums, percussion

Technical
 Pat Moran – engineer, mixing
 Arun – lacquer cut
 Mike Van der Vord – photography (back cover)
 Paul Brierley – photography (front cover)

References

External links 
 Still Life (1976) at vandergraafgenerator.co.uk
 Van der Graaf Generator – Still Life (1976) – at Discogs.com
 Van der Graaf Generator – Still Life (1976) – stream at Spotify.com
 

Still Life
1976 albums
Charisma Records albums
Mercury Records albums
Albums recorded at Rockfield Studios